Dennis White (10 November 1948 – 19 June 2019) was an English professional footballer who played as a full back.

Career
Born in Hartlepool, White played for Hartlepool, South Shields and Bishop Auckland.

Later life and death
White was married with two daughters. He died on 19 June 2019 at the age of 70.

References

1948 births
2019 deaths
English footballers
Hartlepool United F.C. players
Gateshead United F.C. players
Bishop Auckland F.C. players
English Football League players
Association football fullbacks
Footballers from Hartlepool